"Ain't It Different" is a song by British rappers Headie One, AJ Tracey and Stormzy. It was released on 20 August 2020 as the second single from Headie One's debut studio album Edna and peaked at number two on the UK Singles Chart, becoming the highest-charting single for both Headie One and AJ Tracey. The song was nominated for the Brit Award for Song of the Year at the 2021 ceremony.

Composition
The song sees the rappers "trade assertive, straight-talking bars that touch on how life is different now to what it was back in the day when they had a lot less". It samples M-Dubs' "Bump 'n' Grind (I Am Feeling Hot Tonight)" (1999) and Red Hot Chili Peppers' "Pretty Little Ditty" (1989), the latter of which was also famously sampled by Crazy Town for their 2001 single "Butterfly". The song also interpolates Lady Saw's "No Long Talking" (1996). Sonically, the song was described as "a slow-burning drill banger".

Remix
On 25 September 2020, Australian rap collective Onefour released a remix version of the song, which they had previously teased on social media.
A remix with Luciano and Condcta was also released.

Music video
The accompanying music video was released on 20 August 2020 and was directed by Taz Tron Delix. It is set in three locations: a botanical garden, the back of a Benz truck, as well as the streets of London, with a Headie One statue towering over the rappers.

Charts

Weekly charts

Year-end charts

Certifications

References

2020 songs
Headie One songs
AJ Tracey songs
Songs written by AJ Tracey
Songs written by Headie One
Songs written by Stormzy
Stormzy songs
Relentless Records singles
Sony Music UK singles
UK drill songs